Irby may refer to:

 Irby (surname), a list of people
 Irby, Merseyside, England, a village
 Irby, Virginia, United States, an unincorporated community 
 Irby, Washington, United States, an unincorporated community
 Irby in the Marsh, Lincolnshire, England
 Irby upon Humber, Lincolnshire, England

See also
 Irbyville